Brother Joseph McNally (10 August 1923 – 27 August 2002), was an Irish brother from the De La Salle Brothers. He was the founder of St Patrick's Arts Centre, now known as LASALLE College of the Arts, in Singapore.

Early life
McNally grew up in County Mayo. He began studying the arts in high school. McNally left his hometown when he was 14 to join the De La Salle Brothers. He completed his novitiate at the De La Salle Retreat in Castletown, and his scholasticate at De La Salle College in Mallow, County Cork. In 1943, after graduating from De La Salle College, McNally taught at the College, where his interest in the arts grew.  He took art classes at the Mallow Technical School in the evenings while teaching in the daytime.

Education career
In 1946, De La Salle College sent McNally to Singapore to teach at the St Joseph's Institution. After his Singapore posting, McNally was sent to St John's Institution in Kuala Lumpur, Malaysia, and taught there briefly.

He returned to Ireland in 1951, enrolling in the Irish National College of Art. He graduated in 1954, and had his first solo exhibition that same year, at the Brown Thomas Gallery in Dublin.

In 1955, McNally returned to Malaysia to teach at St Paul's Institution in Seremban and later at St Xavier's Institution in Penang. He joined the staff of St Joseph's Training College in Penang in 1958. In 1962, he became the vice-principal of St John's Institution in Kuala Lumpur and in 1963, he was appointed as its principal. In an effort to become close to the local population, McNally became a Malaysian citizen in 1965.

In 1968, McNally went to Columbia University, New York and took up its Master in Arts programme, studying first painting and later sculpture. He returned to Malaysia in 1970 and taught at St Joseph's Training College. He was awarded his PhD in Art Education from Columbia University in 1972.

In 1973, McNally went to Singapore again and taught at St Patrick's School. He became its principal in 1975 and retired in 1982.

In 1984, McNally founded the St Patrick's Arts Centre, serving as its president. He retired in 1997, receiving the honorary title of President Emeritus.

In 1985, McNally became a Singaporean Citizen. Singapore's Ministry of Education sought his advice regarding changes to the national arts syllabus and McNally helped to establish the Art Elective Programme. 1990, McNally was awarded the Pingat Bakti Masyarakat (Public Service Medal) and in 1997, the Pingat Jasa Gemilang (Meritorious Service Medal).

Death
On 27 August 2002, McNally died from a heart attack during a visit to County Mayo, his hometown.

Legacy
In 2006, a new road created outside of the LaSalle College of the Arts in Singapore was named McNally Street in his honour. The Singapore Art Museum held a tribute in 2014, the 12th anniversary of his death.

References

1923 births
2002 deaths
20th-century Irish Roman Catholic priests
De La Salle Brothers
Recipients of the Pingat Jasa Gemilang
Recipients of the Pingat Bakti Masyarakat
Religious leaders from County Mayo
Irish expatriates in Malaysia